The Kingwood Township School District is a community public school district that serves students ranging from pre-kindergarten through eighth grade from Kingwood Township, in Hunterdon County, New Jersey, United States.

As of the 2018–19 school year, the district, comprising one school, had an enrollment of 328 students and 33.2 classroom teachers (on an FTE basis), for a student–teacher ratio of 9.9:1.

The district is classified by the New Jersey Department of Education as being in District Factor Group "FG", the fourth-highest of eight groupings. District Factor Groups organize districts statewide to allow comparison by common socioeconomic characteristics of the local districts. From lowest socioeconomic status to highest, the categories are A, B, CD, DE, FG, GH, I and J.

Students in public school for ninth through twelfth grades attend Delaware Valley Regional High School, together with students from Alexandria Township, Frenchtown, Holland Township and Milford borough. As of the 2018–19 school year, the high school had an enrollment of 721 students and 68.4 classroom teachers (on an FTE basis), for a student–teacher ratio of 10.5:1.

School
Kingwood Township School had an enrollment of 326 students in grades PreK-8 as of the 2018–19 school year.
Timothy Loveland, Principal

Administration
Core members of the district's administration are:
Rick Falkenstein, Chief School Administrator
Michele McCann, Business Administrator / Board Secretary

Board of education
The district's board of education, with nine members, sets policy and oversees the fiscal and educational operation of the district through its administration. As a Type II school district, the board's trustees are elected directly by voters to serve three-year terms of office on a staggered basis, with three seats up for election each year held (since 2012) as part of the November general election.

References

External links
Kingwood Township School District

School Data for the Kingwood Township School District, National Center for Education Statistics

Kingwood Township, New Jersey
New Jersey District Factor Group FG
School districts in Hunterdon County, New Jersey
Public K–8 schools in New Jersey